Lambert Roberts (13 March 1878 – 26 June 1919) was an English cricketer. He played two matches for Gloucestershire in 1900.

References

1878 births
1919 deaths
English cricketers
Gloucestershire cricketers
Sportspeople from Twickenham